Adrian Bucenschi (born 13 November 1974) is a Romanian rower. He competed in the men's coxless four event at the 2000 Summer Olympics.

References

External links
 

1974 births
Living people
Romanian male rowers
Olympic rowers of Romania
Rowers at the 2000 Summer Olympics
Sportspeople from Bucharest